MS Sobieski was a Polish passenger ship launched in 1939. She was named in honour of the Polish king Jan III Sobieski.

Maiden Voyage
The Sobieski only managed one journey before the war, arriving in Buenos Aires on the 10th of July 1939.

Wartime Service
The ship was used as a troopship in the Allied evacuation of western France in 1940 (Operation Aerial), where she was one of the last ships to leave St Jean de Luz during the final evacuation of Polish troops from France, and in the Battle of Dakar. During Operation Streamline Jane, the invasion of Madagascar, in May, 1942, the M.S. Sobieski was the flag ship.

She was also used to transport the British 18th Division to the defence of Singapore.

Post-War
At the end of the war she repatriated the remnants of that division's Cambridgeshire Regiment that had survived captivity at the hands of the Japanese in Malaya and Thailand. She also returned former Changi prisoners of war (POWs) from Singapore, sailing via Cape Town and docking at Liverpool  during a dockworkers' strike. Disgusted, dismayed ex-POWs had to unload their own baggage, such as it was.

Between 1947-1950, the MS Sobieski sailed on the Genoa-Halifax-New York route, under the Polish flag.

The vessel was sold to Russia in 1950 and renamed the MS Gruziya and scrapped in Italy in 1975.

Pictures

References

Passenger ships of Poland
Ocean liners
Cruise ships
Ships built on the River Tyne
Troop ships
World War II merchant ships of Poland
1938 ships
Passenger ships of the Soviet Union
Ships of Black Sea Shipping Company
Ships of the Gdynia-America Line